The Vagabond Inn is an upper-end economy and mid-priced chain of hotels and motels located on the West Coast of the United States. The Vagabond Inn brand is franchised by Vagabond Inn Corporation of El Segundo, California. Today, there are more than 30 Vagabond Inn locations in Arizona, California, Nevada, Oregon, and Texas. The hotels are generally located in busy markets near popular tourist destinations, major attractions, major cities, and airports, ranging in size from 25 to 200 guestrooms.

History 
In 1958, Vagabond Motor Hotels, Inc, a California corporation, opened its first hotel in California: the first Vagabond Inn. It was geared towards the value-conscious leisure and business travelers.

For 50 years, Vagabond Motor Hotels, Inc. extended the Vagabond Inn brand on the West Coast: with hotels in California, Nevada, New Mexico, Oregon and Washington.

In 1994, Vagabond Motor Hotel, Inc. and Imperial Hotel Corp. merged and flagged all Vagabond Inn properties, and continued expansion on the West Coast. 

The success of this collaboration led to the launch of Vagabond Inn Corporation, which is now owned by Vista Investments. The franchising gives the Vagabond Inn brand the opportunity to expand more quickly and in more locations.

In an effort to better meet the needs of the cost-conscious business traveler, Vagabond Inn introduced Vagabond Inn Executive. Although it offers the same value and hospitality of all the locations, the Executive locations also provides business travelers with added amenities.

Locations (External Links) 
There are currently over 30 locations throughout Arizona, California, Nevada, Oregon, and Texas. 
 Vagabond Inn
 Vista Investments

See also 
 List of hotels
 List of motels

Hotel chains in the United States
Motels in the United States